The discography of Yung L.A., an American hip hop recording artist, consists of eight mixtapes, three singles (including one as a featured artist) and four music videos.

Albums

Studio albums

Compilation albums

Mixtapes

Miscellaneous

Singles

As lead artist

As featured artist

Guest appearances
2008
Big Kuntry King - "Posse" (feat. Mac Boney & Yung L.A.)
Big Kuntry King - "Goin' Ham" (feat. Yung L.A.)
J-Money - "Dis Is How We Play" (feat. Shop Boyz & Yung L.A.)
Lil Blue - "Do It" (feat. Gucci Mane & Yung L.A.)
Rob Fetti - "Like Da Pole" (feat. Yung L.A. & Blazed)
Frail Village- "Walk It to the Bank" (feat. LoFat, Rocko & Yung L.A.)
2009
Gucci Mane - "I Put That on Everything" (feat. Yung L.A.)
Playboi Trent - "Money Shuffle" (feat. Yung L.A.)
Yo Gotti - "I'll Ride, I'll Die" (feat. Yung L.A., J Futuristic, Zedzilla & All Star)
Young Dro - "Blessings" (with Yung L.A.)
Young Dro - "Damn I Look Good" (feat. Yung L.A.)
Young Dro - "I Don't Know Y'all" (with Yung L.A.)
Young Dro - "Party" (feat. Yung L.A.)
Young Dro - "Take Off" (feat. Yung L.A.)
Young Dro - "Shine" (feat. Yung L.A.)
Young Dro - "Woah" (feat. Yung L.A.)
2010
A1 - "Cartier Frames" (feat. Yung L.A.)
Big Kuntry King - "Lean" (feat. Yung L.A. & Yo Gotti)
Boss G - Yola City (feat. Yung LA & OJ da Juiceman)
Cam'ron and Vado - "We In This Thing" (feat. Yung L.A.)
Cyse Money - Kinki Swagg (feat. Yung L.A.)
Jose Guapo - 4 Days (feat. Young Dro & Yung L.A.)
Milion - "Outfit" (feat. Yung L.A.)
Rich Kid Shawty - "Splurge (Remix)" (feat. Yung L.A. & Young Dro)
Young Dro - "Freeze Me (Remix)" (feat. Yung L.A., Rick Ross, T.I. & Gucci Mane)
2011
Yung Fresh - "Flex" (feat. Tracy T & Yung L.A.)

Music videos

Featured music videos

Cameo appearances

References

Hip hop discographies
Discographies of American artists